A white fleet comprises the non-combat vehicles of armed forces.  Such vehicles include vans, minibuses, coach buses, touring recruitment vehicles, and staff cars for high-ranking  officers.

The term "white fleet" sees use in several countries - including Australia, New Zealand, and the UK - with reference to fleet management of the defence vehicular assets. The concept contrasts with combat vehicles - the so-called green fleet.

Australia
As of 2015 Australian Department of Defence white fleet vehicles are leased from SG Fleet under contract.

United Kingdom
The UK Ministry of Defence's white fleet ownership was outsourced in 2001 on a 10-year contract to Lex Defence. The contract through a series of acquisitions now comes under the control of Babcock International.

References

Military acquisition
Military transport